Inspector Hornleigh on Holiday is a 1939 British detective film directed by Walter Forde and starring Gordon Harker, Alastair Sim and Linden Travers. It is the sequel to the 1938 film Inspector Hornleigh, and both films are based on the novels by Leo Grex. A third and final film, Inspector Hornleigh Goes To It, followed in 1941.

Plot summary
During a holiday by the British seaside, Inspector Hornleigh (Harker) and Sergeant Bingham (Sim) grow bored and turn their hand to investigating a local crime.

Cast
 Gordon Harker as Inspector Hornleigh  
 Alastair Sim as Sergeant Bingham  
 Linden Travers as Miss Angela Meadows  
 Wally Patch as Police Sergeant  
 Edward Chapman as Captain Edwin Fraser  
 Philip Leaver as Bradfield  
 Kynaston Reeves as Dr. Manners  
 John Turnbull as Chief Constable  
 Wyndham Goldie as Sir George Winbeck

References

External links
 
 Inspector Hornleigh on Holiday at Reel Streets

1939 films
1930s crime comedy films
British crime comedy films
British detective films
Films directed by Walter Forde
20th Century Fox films
British black-and-white films
Films set in London
1939 comedy films
1930s English-language films
1930s British films